Carlos Larraín was the President of National Renewal (Renovación Nacional).

Biography
Carlos Larraín Peña received an LL.B. from the Pontificia Universidad Católica de Chile in 1967, and an M.A. from the Université catholique de Louvain in 1968.

In 1994, he started Larrain y Asociados Ltda., a law firm. In 1996, he was elected as a councilor in Las Condes, and re-elected in 2000, 2004, and 2008. He now serves as the President of National Renewal.

He is a member of the Larraín family.

He is married to Victoria Hurtado and has twelve children. He declares to be a devout Roman Catholic and member of the Opus Dei.

His son, Martín Larraín, ran over a man in his jeep and killed him, in September 2013 on a highway. After a 1st and 2nd judiciary process his son was acquitted of driving under the influence of alcohol. The final proves where that he phoned for emergency services for 50 minutes, then fled the scene, leaving two friends to account for what had happened.  No immediate blood test was performed, hence no blood alcohol level was established. The two former friends were later charged with obstruction of justice. 
The case was largely public in social networks and media and inspired the 2016 film Much Ado About Nothing.

References

External links

Official blog
 Genealogy of the Larraín family in Chile in Genealog.cl (in Spanish)

1942 births
Living people
Chilean Roman Catholics
Chilean people of Basque descent
National Party (Chile, 1966) politicians
National Renewal (Chile) politicians
Members of the Senate of Chile
Pontifical Catholic University of Chile alumni
Catholic University of Leuven alumni
20th-century Chilean lawyers
21st-century Chilean lawyers
Chilean anti-communists
Carlos
Municipal councillors of Las Condes
Mayors of Las Condes